Charles or Charlie Mills may refer to:

Academics

C. Wright Mills (1916–1962), American sociologist, author of The Power Elite
Charles Mills (historian) (1788–1826), English scholar
Charles Henry Mills (1873–1937), American composer and director of the University of Wisconsin–Madison School of Music
Charles W. Mills (1951–2021), philosophy professor at The Graduate Center, City University of New York
Charles Karsner Mills, (1845–1930), dean of American neurology

Artists

Charles Mills (artist, born 1920) (1920–2009), African-American artist
Charles Mills (Massachusetts artist) (1856–1956), American artist from the state of Massachusetts
Charlie Mills (animator) (born 1954), British animator

Sportspeople

Charles Mills (English cricketer) (1816–?)
Charles Mills (South African cricketer) (1867–1948), full name Charles Henry Mills, South African cricketer
Chuck Mills (1928–2021), American football coach
Charlie Mills (baseball) (1844–1874), Major League Baseball catcher
Charlie Mills (harness racer) (1888–1972), German harness racing driver and trainer

Business and industry

Sir Charles Mills, 1st Baronet (1792–1872), British banker
Charles Karsner Mills (1845–1930), American physician and neurologist
Charles E. Mills (1867-1929), American businessman, CEO of Apache Powder Co and Valley Bank of Arizona
Charles N. Mills (born 1961), American businessman, CEO of Medline Industries

Military figures

Charles Mills (Medal of Honor) (1840–?), American Civil War sailor and Medal of Honor recipient
Charles Mills (Royal Navy officer) (1914–2006), Governor of Guernsey

Politicians

Charles Mills (1755–1826), British Member of Parliament for Warwick, 1802–1826
Charles Mills, 1st Baron Hillingdon (1830–1898), UK Member of Parliament for Northallerton, 1865–1866 and Western Kent, 1868–1885
Charles Mills, 2nd Baron Hillingdon (1855–1919), UK Member of Parliament for Sevenoaks, 1885–1892 
Charles H. Mills (1843–1923), New Zealand politician
Charles Henry Mills (Canadian politician) (1861–?), politician from Ontario, Canada
Charles Mills (Uxbridge MP) (1887–1915), UK Member of Parliament for Uxbridge, 1910–1915

Other
Charles Mills (1810 ship)

Mills, Charles